State Highway 206 (SH 206) is a Texas state highway running from US 67 near Coleman northeast to Cisco.

History

SH 206 was originally designated on July 23, 1934, replacing a section of SH 23 between Coleman and Rising Star. By 1939, the section between Cross Plains and Rising Star was transferred to SH 36. On October 24, 1955, SH 206 was extended over old US 67 to new US 67. On March 22, 1960, SH 206 was extended northeast from Cross Plains to FM 569. On June 26, 1962, SH 206 was extended from FM 569 to another point on FM 569 2 miles south of US 80. On June 27, 1963, SH 206 was extended to US 80. The route was extended into Cisco on August 28, 1991, replacing US 80 when it was decommissioned west of Dallas.

Route description
SH 206 begins at a junction with US 67.  It heads north from this junction to an intersection with FM 1026.  The highway continues to the north to an intersection with FM 568 in Coleman.  Heading towards the north through Coleman, the highway continues to a junction with SH 153.  It runs concurrently with SH 153 briefly before it continues to the north to an intersection with US 84 and US 283.  It continues to the north concurrent with both US 84 and US 283 until US 84 splits off to the northwest and US 283 and SH 206 continue concurrently briefly until they also split with US 283 heading north and SH 206 continuing to the northeast.  It heads northeast from this junction through Coleman to an intersection with FM 3425.  The highway leaves Coleman as it continues to the northeast to an intersection with FM 2302.  Heading towards the northeast, the highway continues to a junction with FM 1176.  The highway continues to the northeast to an intersection with FM 585.  It continues to the northeast to a junction with FM 2806.  As the highway continues to the northeast, it intersects FM 2707.  It heads northeast from this junction to an intersection with SH 279.  The highway continues to the northeast to an intersection with SH 36 in Cross Plains.  Heading towards the northeast through Cross Plains, the highway continues to a junction with FM 374.  The highway continues to the northeast through Cross Plains to an intersection with FM 880.  It continues to the northeast to a junction with FM 569.  As the highway continues to the northeast, it intersects FM 2526.  It heads northeast from this junction to an intersection with FM 1864.  The highway continues to the northeast to an intersection with FM 569. Heading towards the northeast, the highway continues to a junction with I-20 in Cisco.  The highway continues to the northeast through Cisco to an intersection with FM 2945.  SH 206 reaches its northern terminus at US 183 and SH 6 in Cisco.

Junction list

References

206
Transportation in Coleman County, Texas
Transportation in Brown County, Texas
Transportation in Callahan County, Texas
Transportation in Eastland County, Texas